In optics, a conjugate plane or conjugate focal plane of a given plane P, is the plane P′ such that points on P are imaged on P′. If an object is moved to the point occupied by its image, then the moved object's new image will appear at the point where the object originated. In other words, the object and its image are interchangeable. This comes from the principle of reversibility which states light rays will travel along the originating path if the light's direction is reversed. The points that span conjugate planes are called conjugate points.

It comes from the mirror formula 1/v+1/u=1/f where if u and v are interchanged then the equation remains same.

In a telescope, the subject focal plane is at infinity and the conjugate image plane, at which the image sensor is placed, is said to be an infinite conjugate. In microscopy and macro photography, the subject is close to the lens, so the plane at which the image sensor is placed is said to be a finite conjugate. Within a system with relay lenses or eyepieces, there may be planes that are conjugate to the aperture.

References 

Geometrical optics